Men's Studies Press (MSP) was an academic publisher registered in Harriman, Tennessee, from 1992. They produced three journals, and also published monographs and collections of essays. MSP also administered a website – MensStudies.info – of resources related to men's studies. They ceased publishing in 2016.

Past mission statement

Journals
The Journal of Men's Studies (1992-2014), published by SAGE Publications as of 2015.
International Journal of Men's Health (since 2002) 
Fathering: A Journal of Theory, Research, and Practice about Men as Fathers (since 2003) 
Thymos: Journal of Boyhood Studies (2007-2013), published by Berghahn Books as of 2015, under the new name, Boyhood Studies: An Interdisciplinary Journal.
Culture, Society and Masculinities (since 2009)

Monographs
Frieman, Barry. The Divorcing Father's Manual: 8 Steps to Help You and Your Children Survive and Thrive. MPS, 2005. 
Gray, Ross. Prostate Tales: Men's Experiences with Prostate Cancer. MSP, 2003. 
Janssen, Diederik. International guide to literature on masculinity: a bibliography. MPS, March 2008.  (pbk. : alk. paper) --  (electronic)
Lee, Terry. A New Path at Midlife: Transformative Relationship & Story for Men. MSP, 2007. 
Sargent, Paul. Real Men or Real Teachers? Contradictions in the Lives of Men Elementary School Teachers. MPS, 2001.

Essay collections
Botherson, Sean E. and Joseph M. White (editors). Why Fathers Count: The Importance of Fathers and Their Involvement with Children. MSP, 2007. 
Focus on Fathers and Fatherhood. MSP, 2007. 
Josep M. Armengol and Àngels Carabí (editors). Debating Masculinities. MSP, 2009.

See also
Men's studies
Gender studies
Women's studies

References

External links

Academic publishing companies
Publishing companies of the United States
Men's studies literature
Companies based in Tennessee
Publishing companies established in 1992
1992 establishments in Tennessee